Eagle Butte is a Nevada peak east of Simpson Park.

References

External links 
 

Mountains of Nevada
Landforms of Lander County, Nevada